A low-voltage detect (LVD) is a microcontroller or microprocessor peripheral that generates a reset signal when the Vcc supply voltage falls below Vref. Sometimes is combined with power-on reset (POR) and then it is called POR-LVD.

See also
Power-on reset

Embedded systems